Wedgewood Heights is an irregularly shaped neighbourhood in west Edmonton, Alberta, Canada.  According to the City of Edmonton map utility, "most of the roads in Wedgewood Heights are named in honour of well-known Edmontonians."

While there was a limited amount of residential development during the 1960s and 1970s according to the 2001 federal census, most of the residential development in Wedgewood Heights occurred after 1985. One in five (18.5%) of the residences were built between 1986 and 1990. Almost three out of four (72.8%) of the residences were built during the 1990s.

According to the 2005 municipal census, all of the residences in the neighbourhood were single family residences.  Substantially all of them were owner occupied with less than 0.5% being rented.

The neighbourhood is bounded to the west and south west by Anthony Henday Drive, to the south east by Wedgewood Ravine and the North Saskatchewan River valley, to the north west by Lessard Road, and to the north east by 184 Street and another ravine.  The Anthony Henday provides access to destinations to the south of the city including the Edmonton International Airport.

Demographics 

Surrounding neighbourhoods 

The east point of the neighbourhood overlooks the North Saskatchewan River.

References

External links 
 Wedgewood Heights Neighbourhood Profile

Neighbourhoods in Edmonton